The Steady Growth Stakes is a Thoroughbred horse race run annually in early June at Woodbine Racetrack in Toronto, Ontario, Canada. An Ontario Sire Stakes, it is a restricted race for horses age three and older. Raced over a distance of  miles on Polytrack synthetic dirt, the Steady Growth Stakes currently carries a purse of $95,313

Inaugurated in 1997, the race is named in honor of Steady Growth, the 1979 Queen's Plate winner and Canadian Champion 3-Year-Old Colt.

Records
Speed record:
 1:42.20 - Deputy Inxs (1997)

Most wins:
 3 - Barbeau Ruckus (2003, 2005, 2006)
 3 - Pender Harbour (2012, 2014, 2015)

Most wins by a jockey:
 3 - Na Somsanith (1997, 1999, 2001)
 3 - Todd Kabel (1998, 2005, 2006)
 3 - Luis Contreras (2012, 2014, 20150
 3 - Eurico Rosa Da Silva (2009, 2013, 2016)

Most wins by a trainer:
 2 - Abraham Katryan (2000, 2002)
 2 - Ross Armata (2003, 2005)
 3 - Mike DePaulo (2012, 2014, 2015)

Most wins by an owner:
 3 - Thayalan Muthulingham (2003, 2005, 2006)

Winners

References
 The 2009 Steady Growth Stakes at Woodbine Entertainment Corp.

Ontario Sire Stakes
Ungraded stakes races in Canada
Recurring sporting events established in 1997
Woodbine Racetrack
1997 establishments in Ontario